is a Japanese former professional darts player.

Career
Nagakawa qualified for the 2008 PDC World Darts Championship, losing in the preliminary round to Anthony Forde. He qualified again for the 2009 PDC World Darts Championship, but lost again in the preliminary round, this time losing to Warren French. The match with French is widely considered to be the worst match ever in the history of either the PDC or BDO World Championships, where both players averaged 54. The standard was so poor, that Sky Sports stopped broadcasting it halfway through.

World Championship results

PDC
 2008: Last 68: (lost to Anthony Forde 2–5) (legs)
 2009: Last 70: (lost to Warren French 3–5)

External links
Profile and stats on Darts Database
 https://web.archive.org/web/20120406211250/http://www.pdc.tv/page/WorldChampsDetail/0%2C%2C10180~1494376%2C00.html

1972 births
Japanese darts players
Living people
Professional Darts Corporation associate players